The Meriwether County School District is a public school district in Meriwether County, Georgia, United States, based in Greenville. It serves the communities of Gay, Greenville, Haralson, Lone Oak, Luthersville, Manchester, Pine Mountain, Warm Springs, and Woodbury.

Schools
The Meriwether County School District has two elementary schools, two middle schools, and two high schools.

Elementary schools
Mountain View Elementary School
Unity Elementary School

Middle school
Greenville Middle School
Manchester Middle School

High school
Greenville High School
Manchester High School

References

External links

School districts in Georgia (U.S. state)
Education in Meriwether County, Georgia